The 2021 Arab Club Basketball Championship was the 33rd season of the Arab Club Basketball Championship. The tournament started on 29 September 2021 and ended on 9 October 2021. The entire tournament was held in Alexandria, Egypt, as all games were played in the Hall Al Ettehad Al Sakandary Club or in the Borj Al Arab Hall.

Al Ittihad Alexandria was the defending champion. Al Ahly Cairo won its first Arab championship.

Regular season
The draw for the groups was held 20 September 2021.

Group A

Group B

Group C

Group D

Playoffs
The playoffs are played in a single-elimination format and began on 6 October and ended on 9 October 2022.

Final

Individual awards

References

2021 in basketball
International basketball competitions hosted by Egypt
Sport in the Arab world
Sport in Alexandria